Alison Riske was the defending champion, but lost to Maria João Koehler in the semifinals.

Monica Puig won the title defeating Maria João Koehler in the final 3–6, 6–4, 6–1.

Seeds

Main draw

Finals

Top half

Bottom half

References
 Main Draw
 Qualifying Draw

Open GDF Suez de Touraine - Singles